This is a list of List of Harlequin Romance novels released in 2007.

Releases

References 

Lists of Harlequin Romance novels
2007 novels